Tirupati–Amravati Express is a Superfast train belonging to Indian Railways connecting Tirupati in Andhra Pradesh with Amravati in Maharashtra.

References

External links
http://indiarailinfo.com/train/-train-tirupati-amravati-sf-express-12765/16443/837/3446

Transport in Tirupati
Transport in Amravati
Railway services introduced in 2011
Express trains in India
Rail transport in Andhra Pradesh
Rail transport in Telangana
Rail transport in Maharashtra